Amosovo is a rural locality (a settlement) in Denyatinskoye Rural Settlement, Melenkovsky District, Vladimir Oblast, Russia. The population was 8 as of 2010. There is 1 street.

Geography 
Amosovo is located 6 km north of Melenki (the district's administrative centre) by road. Ivatino is the nearest rural locality.

References 

Rural localities in Melenkovsky District